Redcoats is a Melbourne-based rock band signed to Island Records Australia, which is part of Universal Music Australia. The band members consist of Emilio Mercuri on vocals, Neil Wilkinson on guitar, Rhys Kelly on bass and Andrew Braidner on the drums.

Discography

Studio albums

EPs

References

External links 

 
 
 

Australian indie rock groups
Musical groups established in 2009
Australian indie pop groups
Musical groups from Melbourne